The General Entertainment Authority (GEA), formerly the General Authority for Entertainment (GAE), is a government department in Saudi Arabia that regulates the entertainment industry of the country. Established in May 2016 through a royal decree by King Salman, it is responsible for the development, advancement and expansion of Saudi Arabia's growing entertainment sector.

History 
The General Entertainment Authority was established on 7 May 2016 in accordance with a Royal Decree No. (A/133) issued by King Salman. Among the king's royal decree which included 67 announcements, the General Authority for Culture was the only other entity to be created.

Mission 
The Saudi population spends $22 billion dollars in tourism and entertainment outside the country every year. The government aims to transform 25% of that spending into local travel and entertainment to create a solid Saudi tourism economy. The Saudi Vision 2030 plan aims to raise capital by harnessing the previously unaddressed entertainment sector, helping to "nurture entertainment in all its forms, while also seeking to safeguard our precious cultural heritage".

The General Authority for Entertainment defines the vision and evolution of the Saudi Arabia’s entertainment industry. It partners with both public and private actors, to reduce government spending on entertainment. In December 2016, the General Authority for Entertainment’s Chairman, Ahmed Al Khateeb, stated that the organization was created to boost citizen participation and opportunities for the youth.

Events and entertainment facilities 
In early 2017, Jeddah held the first-ever Saudi Comic Con. The event dedicated to films, comics and anime featured celebrity appearances and was backed by the General Authority for Entertainment.

In November 2016, Six Flags Entertainment Corporation announced planned expansions into Saudi Arabia, and the board of the GEA was appointed to manage the development of the theme parks in the country. Three parks are planned for construction, with the first one set to open by 2021.

The General Authority for entertainment launched an online entertainment calendar, Roznamah (calendar in Arabic), in order to communicate about, and compile over 300 upcoming and past events, nationwide. It features upcoming film screenings and performances by Cirque du Soleil, Universe Science, the Light Festival and the Lion King musical.

In March 2019, the GEA in collaboration with the General Sports Authority, General Culture Authority and the  Saudi Commission for Tourism and National Heritage organized Sharqiah Season in the Eastern region of Saudi Arabia. Sharqiah Season is a 17-day festival that is launched in the shores of Alkhobar Corniche where many activities take place. Among such activities, the King Abdul Aziz Center for World Culture (Ithra) features the lives of many prominent artists and intellectuals from all over the world, such as Leonardo da Vinci. Moreover, 80 events were allocated this season to feature a number of Saudi cities including, Dammam, Dhahran, Alkhobar, Al-Ahsa and Jubail. As part of the Season, thousands of youngsters attended the first Saudi Colour Run in Khobar. This festival comes in the framework of the Saudi Vision 2030 that aims at boosting local tourism and entertainment. The GEA launched Riyadh Season, the largest entertainment festival in the Middle East, with more than 7,000 events held in period of 6 months. Riyadh Season was first launched in 2019 and came in its second edition in 2021.

GEA has organized the largest Quran competition and the first Adhan competition in 2019. The competition has been participated by 13,000 from 162 countries. The main aim of the contest is to highlight the cultural diversity in the Islamic World that is shown in the different Quran recitation and adhan styles.

Structure

New Entertainment Academy 
GEA has supported the establishment of an entertainment academy. The academy is planned to open in September 2019 and provide a number of courses and diploma programs. The academy will be located in Riyadh. The main goal of the project is to provide Saudi youth with the tools necessary to enable them to work in the flourishing entertainment sector in Saudi Arabia.

International Scholarship Program 
The GEA launched an international scholarship program that aims at training and educating young Saudis in the entertainment field in a number of prestigious universities worldwide. This program is undertaken in partnership with the Qiddiya Investment Co. (QIC). The program will enable its students to have a future job in Qiddiya mega project as well as the many other entertainment projects taking place in Saudi Arabia.

Board 
The board’s members meet every three months, and include male, female, foreign and local actors, with His Excellency Turki Al-Sheikh as Chairman of the GEA.

The Board members include:
Turki Al-Sheikh: Chairman of the Board of the General Entertainment Authority
Dr. Majid bin Abdullah Al Qasabi: Minister of Commerce and Investment in Saudi Arabia
Eng. Fahad Mohammed Al Jubair: Mayor of Eastern Region
Eng. Mohammed Abdul Latif Jameel: Chairman and CEO of Abdul Latif Jameel
Dr. Lama Abdulaziz AlSulaiman: Former Vice Chairwoman and Board Member of the Jeddah Chamber of Commerce & Industry
Eng. Mousa Omran Al Omran: General Manager of West Bakeries Company & Independent Director of Almarai
Mr. Bandar Mohammed Assiri: Head of General Commission for Audio-visual Media
Mr. Joe Zenas: Chief Executive Officer at Thinkwell Group
Mr. Jonathan Tétrault: Executive Vice-President and Chief Operating Officer at Cirque du Soleil

GEA Challenges 
It was a competition held in 2019 between talented young Saudis in different fields including,  playing instruments and singing, comedy scripts and content, graffiti, animation, films, acting, on-screen fashion, culinary arts, and circus and acrobatic talents. The winner of the challenge will get $5.3 million.

Criticism
Some Saudi conservatives have criticized the opening up of Saudi Arabia's entertainment sector. The GEA has defended the development of the entertainment sector as being popularly supported by the Saudi public, most of whom is under 30.

In 2019, Saudi Islamic scholar Omar Al-Muqbil criticized the GEA's policies as threatening Saudi culture. Al-Muqbil was arrested by Saudi authorities.

References

External links 
 

2016 establishments in Saudi Arabia
Government agencies established in 2016
Government agencies of Saudi Arabia